IPSA or Ipsa may refer to:

Organizations
 I. P. Sharp Associates, a Canadian company, creator of the IPSANET computer network
 Independent Parliamentary Standards Authority, a public body in the United Kingdom
 Institut polytechnique des sciences avancées, a French private aerospace engineering postgraduate college
 International Political Science Association, a UNESCO scholarly association
 International Professional Surrogates Association, a non-profit organization dedicated to advancing sexual surrogate therapy

Publications
 International Political Science Abstracts, an academic journal, published on behalf of the International Political Science Association

People
 Kristijan Ipša (born 1986), Croatian footballer of Slovenian heritage

Other uses
 Ipsa, a genus of sea snails
 Índice de Precio Selectivo de Acciones, a Chilean Stock Index
 Intimate partner sexual assault, a variant term for spousal rape

See also
 International Public Sector Accounting Standards (IPSAS), a set of accounting standards